XHMDA-FM is a radio station on 104.9 FM in Monclova, Coahuila. It is owned by GRM Radio and known as La Mera Ley with a grupera format.

History
XEMDA-AM 1170 received its concession on March 26, 1997. It was a 500-watt daytimer originally owned by Radiorama subsidiary Comunicación y Cultura, S.A. In February 1999, Karam, who owned GRM, bought XEMDA from Radiorama in exchange for XECPN-AM in Piedras Negras. Under GRM, XEMDA began operating with 1,000 watts during the day and 500 at night.

In January 2012, XEMDA was authorized to migrate to FM on 104.9 MHz.

References

Radio stations in Coahuila